Mughal or Moghul may refer to:

Related to the Mughal Empire
 Mughal Empire of South Asia between the 16th and 19th centuries
 Mughal dynasty
 Mughal emperors
 Mughal people, a social group of Central and South Asia
 Mughal architecture
 Mughlai cuisine
 Mughal painting
 Grand Mughal, exonymous title given to the Mughal emperors
 Empire of the Moghul, historical fiction novel series by Alex Rutherford
 Moghuls (TV series) or The Empire, Indian TV series based on the novels

Other uses
 Moghulistan in Central Asia
 Moghol people
 Moghul, Iran, a village
 Mirza Mughal (1817–1857), a Mughal prince
 Arjumman Mughal, Indian actress
 Chaya Mughal, Indian cricketer
 Fiyaz Mughal, founder of Tell MAMA
 Tehmasp Rustom Mogul, Indian sailor
 Mughal Road, road in Jammu and Kashmir, India
 Mughal Sarai, town in Uttar Pradesh, India, originally a Mughal caravanserai
 Mughal Sarai, Surat, historical caravanserai in Gujarat, India
 Mughal Serai, village in Punjab, India
 Mughal Serai, Doraha, caravanserai and fort in Punjab, India

See also 
 Mogul (disambiguation)
 Moghuls (disambiguation)
 Mogol (disambiguation)
 Mughal-e-Azam (disambiguation)